The left and right brachiocephalic veins (previously called innominate veins) are major veins in the upper chest, formed by the union of each corresponding internal jugular vein and subclavian vein. This is at the level of the sternoclavicular joint. The left brachiocephalic vein is more than twice the length of the right brachiocephalic vein.

These veins merge to form the superior vena cava, a great vessel, posterior to the junction of the first costal cartilage with the manubrium of the sternum.

The brachiocephalic veins are the major veins returning blood to the superior vena cava.

Left and right veins

Left brachiocephalic vein
The left brachiocephalic vein is about 6cm, more than twice the length of the right brachiocephalic vein. and is formed by the confluence of the left subclavian and left internal jugular veins. In addition the left vein receives drainage from the following tributaries:
The left vertebral vein, internal thoracic vein, inferior thyroid veins, superior intercostal veins, the thymic veins and the pericardial veins

Right brachiocephalic vein
The right brachiocephalic vein is about 2.5cm long. The right vein is formed by the confluence of the right subclavian vein and the right internal jugular vein. It receives the following tributaries:
The right vertebral vein, the internal thoracic vein, and the thyroid veins, and occasionally from the first right posterior intercostal veins.

Embryological origin
The left brachiocephalic vein forms from the anastomosis formed between the left and right anterior cardinal veins when the caudal portion of the left anterior cardinal vein degenerates.

Additional images

See also 
 Hip bone (Innominate bone)
 Brachiocephalic artery (Innominate artery)

References

Veins of the torso